In linguistics, gapping is a type of ellipsis that occurs in the non-initial conjuncts of coordinate structures. Gapping usually elides minimally a finite verb and further any non-finite verbs that are present. This material is "gapped" from the non-initial conjuncts of a coordinate structure. Gapping exists in many languages, but by no means in all of them, and gapping has been studied extensively and is therefore one of the more understood ellipsis mechanisms. Stripping is viewed as a particular manifestation of the gapping mechanism where just one remnant (instead of two or more) appears in the gapped/stripped conjunct.

Basic examples
Canonical examples of gapping have a true "gap", which means the elided material appears medially in the non-initial conjuncts, with a remnant to its left and a remnant to its right. The elided material of gapping in all the examples below is indicated with subscripts and a smaller font:

Some ate bread, and others ate rice.
Fred likes to pet the cat, and Sally likes to pet the dog.
Jim has been observed by me, and Tom has been observed by you.

In the first sentence, the second conjunct has the subject others, the object rice, but the verb has been 'gapped', that is, omitted. Gapping can span several verbs and nonfinite clause boundaries, as the second and third sentence illustrate, but it cannot apply across a finite clause boundary, as seen in the next sentence:

 *Sam said that they spoke German, and Charlene said that they spoke Spanish.

The star * indicates that the sentence is bad. Gapping is also incapable of operating backwards, which means that the antecedent to the gap must precede the gap. Attempts at gapping where the gap precedes its antecedent are quite bad, e.g.

 *He orders beer, and she orders wine.

Further examples
While the canonical cases of gapping have medial gaps, the gap can also be discontinuous, e.g.

Should I call you, or should you call me?
Will Jimmy greet Jill first, or will Jill greet Jimmy first?
He believes her to know the answer, and she believes him to know the answer.
I expect you to help, and you expect me to help.

Many syntacticians take stripping (= bare argument ellipsis) to be a particular manifestation of gapping where only one remnant appears instead of two or more. If this assumption is correct, then the same ellipsis mechanism is at work in the following cases:

Sam has done the work, and Bill has done the work, too.
Sophie barks at racoons in the morning, and Sophie barks at squirrels in the morning, too.
Did Frank get married first, or did Larry get married first?

In its manifestation as stripping, the gapping mechanism occurs frequently. Gapping is widely assumed to obligatorily elide a finite verb. However, gapping can also occur when no finite verb is involved, e.g.

With her keen on him, and him keen on her, the party should be fun.
It is impossible for Connor to be nice to Jilian, or Jilian to be nice to Connor.

The gap of gapping cannot, however, cut into a major constituent, e.g.

 *I read the story about elves, and you read the story about dwarves.
 *Pictures of friends should make you smile, and pictures of enemies should make you frown.

Theoretical analyses
Gapping challenges phrase structure theories of syntax because it is not evident how one might produce a satisfactory analysis of the material that can be gapped. The problem concerns the fact that the elided material often does not qualify as a constituent, as many of the examples above illustrate. Faced with this challenge, one prominent approach is to assume some sort of movement. The remnants are moved out of an encompassing parent constituent so that the parent constituent can then be deleted. In other words, there is an ordering of transformations. First the remnants are moved out of their parent constituent and then that parent constituent is elided. The difficulty with such movement analyses concerns the nature of the movement mechanisms, since the movement mechanism needed to vacate the parent constituent would be unlike the recognized movement mechanisms (fronting, scrambling, extraposition).

An alternative analysis of gapping assumes that the catena is the basic unit of syntactic analysis. The catena is associated with dependency grammars and is defined as any word or any combination of words that is continuous with respect to dominance. The elided material of gapping always qualifies as a catena. This situation is illustrated with the following tree, which shows the dependency structure of a well-known example from Ross 1970:

The a-clause is from Ross, whereas the clauses b-i have been added to illustrate the role that the catena plays. The (at least somewhat) acceptable clauses a-d have the elided material corresponding to a catena each time, whereas the clauses e-i are unacceptable each time because the elided material does not correspond to a catena. The star * indicates that the clauses are bad. For instance, the elided material wants...to begin, to the exclusion of to try, is not a catena in (g). The other main forms of ellipsis (e.g. answer fragments, sluicing, VP-ellipsis, etc.) can also all be investigated in terms of the catena. The elided material of most if not all ellipsis mechanisms corresponds to catenae.

See also

Catena (linguistics)
Constituent (linguistics)
Coordination (linguistics)
Dependency grammar
Ellipsis (linguistics)
Phrase structure grammar
Pseudogapping
Sluicing
Verb phrase ellipsis

Notes

References

Carnie, A. 2013. Syntax: A generative introduction. 3rd edition. Malden, MA: Wiley-Blackwell. 
Hankamer, J. 1973. Unacceptable ambiguity. Linguistic Inquiry, 4, 17–68.
Hankamer, J. 1979. Deletion in coordinate structures. New York: Garland Publishing, Inc.
Hartmann, K. 2000. Right Node Raising and gapping: Interface conditions on prosodic deletion.'' Amsterdam: John Benjamins.
Jackendoff, R. 1971. Gapping and related rules. Linguistic Inquiry 2, 21-35.
Johnson, K. 2009. Gapping is not (VP) ellipsis. Linguistic Inquiry.
Kuno, S. 1976. Gapping: A functional analysis. Linguistic Inquiry 7, 300–318.
Kroeger, P. 2004: Analyzing syntax: A lexical-functional approach. Cambridge, UK: Cambridge University Press.
McCawley, J. 1988. The syntactic phenomena of English. Chicago: The University of Chicago Press.
Osborne, T. 2006. Gapping vs. non-gapping coordination. Linguistische Berichte 207, 307-338.
Osborne, T., M. Putnam, and T. Groß 2012. Catenae: Introducing a novel unit of syntactic analysis. Syntax 15, 4, 354-396.
Sag, I. 1976 Deletion and logical form. Doctoral Dissertation, MIT, Cambridge, Massachusetts.
Ross, J. 1970. Gapping and the order of constituents. In M. Bierwisch & K Heidolph (eds.), Progress in linguistics: A collection of papers, pp. 249–259, The Hague: Mouton.

Generative syntax
English grammar